The Brewster House is in Galt, California. It is a wooden Victorian Italianate style house built in 1869–70. It was listed on the National Register of Historic Places in 1978.

It is a two-story wood-frame house.  It has also been known as Cinquinis House.

See also
National Register of Historic Places listings in Sacramento County, California
California Historical Landmarks in Sacramento County, California

References

Houses in Sacramento County, California
National Register of Historic Places in Sacramento County, California
Houses on the National Register of Historic Places in California
Houses completed in 1869
Italianate architecture in California
1869 establishments in California